CI5: The New Professionals is a British television action crime drama series, created and principally written by Brian Clemens, that first broadcast on Sky One on 19 September 1999. Billed as an updated version of the 1970s terrestrial television series The Professionals, the series is set in a fictional government agency known as CI5 (Criminal Intelligence Department 5). The original group of three men - Doyle, Bodie and their boss Cowley - are replaced by a team consisting of Harry Malone (Edward Woodward), Chris Keel (Kal Weber), Sam Curtis (Colin Wells) and Tina Backus (Lexa Doig). In a similar manner to The Professionals, the series included a number of high-budget impressive action sequences, often filmed in a James Bond-esque style.

An initial thirteen episode series was offered to all major British broadcasters. At one time, it was suggested that ITV would broadcast the series, but after attempting to secure a cheaper deal for broadcast rights, producer David Wickes told The Daily Mail that he "would sooner lock it away in a vault than hand it over to ITV for next to nothing." Sky chose to invest in the series, after considerable editing which removed a number of sequences deemed "excessively violent or disturbing".

Sky provided the show with considerable pre-publicity, but viewer response to the show was extremely poor, with the low production values and perceived low-quality acting being widely mocked among those who watched it. The inevitable comparisons to the original series were uniformly negative, also the series was not a success in the ratings. The overall reaction was that Sky, which normally aimed to maximise its value from any of its programming by repeating it extensively, chose never to re-broadcast it after its premiere run. Subsequently, the series was not repeated on any other satellite television channel until 2012. The series, in its original, uncut form, was eventually released on Region 2 DVD on August 8, 2016.

Development
David Wickes, an episode director for the original series, approached original series creator Brian Clemens in the early 1990s after realising how perpetually popular the original series remained through repeats and video sales. Having since formed his own production company, David Wickes Television, and having already produced several lucrative and award-winning productions, such as Jack The Ripper (co-starring The Professionals actor Lewis Collins), Wickes spent the 1990s devising the production of an updated show, based on Clemens' original intentions. Clemens intended for the original series to be an "ensemble" group, not just focusing on the three main characters. The new show was intended to return to this intended ideal, with the new 4.5 (originally Doyle) and 3.7 (Bodie) as part of a team effort.

Of the original series' stars, Gordon Jackson died in 1990 and allegedly, though not verified, Wickes "never even thought" of approaching Martin Shaw. Since some of the co-financing for the show was derived from his association with American TV networks, he did, however, approach Lewis Collins to see if he would reprise his role of Bodie as the Controller of CI5. This was because Collins had based himself almost exclusively in America since the mid-1990s. Collins declined the role, and so instead Edward Woodward, famous for his roles in Callan and The Equalizer was cast as CI5 Head, Harry Malone.

Actors Colin Wells and Kal Weber became Sam Curtis and Chris Keel respectively, whilst Lexa Doig was cast Tina Backus. Though the main "trio" along with Harry Malone carried the show, several other secondary roles such as Corrigan, Mills, Richards and Spencer were cast to ensure Clemens' original ideal was adhered to. Colin Wells and Kal Weber were claimed to get along with each other very well, and this purportedly encouraged Brian Clemens to continue writing for the new series. Of the thirteen-episode run, Clemens solely is credited with writing seven episodes and co-writing two others.

Broadcast
Despite the problems caused by the show initially being shown on a satellite channel few viewers in the United Kingdom had access to, the series was sold to over fifty countries worldwide and was hugely popular in Europe. The series first known broadcast was in Sweden on Kanal 5, where broadcast commenced on 3 September 1998. The series was shown three times consecutively due to its popularity. Denmark, Ireland, Hong Kong and the Philippines also broadcast the series in 1998, more than a year before the series finally reached British audiences. Some countries, such as New Zealand, dropped the series mid-run due to disappointing viewing figures.

For several years, the series remained unrepeated. However, in November 2011, GBC TV in Gibraltar began airing the series on Sundays from 6 November. Men & Movies then began broadcasting the series weekdays at 6:00 pm from 19 March 2012, although the episodes shown had even more judicious edits than when the series was shown by Sky One in 1999. In several episodes, whole gun battles were completely removed, with up to four minutes of extra footage cut out on top of the material already removed by Sky over a decade before. Movies4Men later began broadcasting the series in April 2012. Like the original broadcasts, the episodes were heavy edited to remove any strong violence and bloodshed. Episodes were shown weekdays at 8:00 pm.

In 2020, newly launched streaming service the Roku channel made the series available for free.

Release
In March 2012, it was revealed that work was under-way on two exclusively recorded audio commentaries with creator Brian Clemens and producer David Wickes, suggesting that a potential DVD release was forthcoming. Madman Entertainment were the first to release the series on DVD, exclusively for Region 4 in August 2012. In 2014, Visual Entertainment released the series in Region 1 as a stand-alone release and as a part of the bonus content for complete collection boxset of The Equalizer.

In 2016, Network acquired the rights for a Region 2 release, which included several bonus features, including trailers, promotional films, a clip from London Tonight, an electronic press kit, image gallery and script PDFs.

Cast
 Edward Woodward as Harry Malone (Episodes 1–13)
 Kal Weber as Chris Keel (Episodes 1–13)
 Colin Wells as Sam Curtis (Episodes 1–13)
 Lexa Doig as Tina Backus (Episodes 1–13)
 Adrian Irvine as Spencer (Episodes 1–7, 10–13)
 Charlotte Cornwell as the Minister (Episodes 1, 4 & 10)

Episodes

References

External links
 
 

1990s British crime drama television series
1999 British television series debuts
1999 British television series endings
British action television series
Espionage television series
Sky UK original programming
English-language television shows
Television series reboots